Mantra is an album by New York City hardcore punk band Shelter. Released in 1995, it was the band's first album for Roadrunner.

Lyrically the album focuses mainly on Hare Krishna religious philosophy and social commentary on Western civilization — including a manifesto entitled Supersoul in the album's booklet, authored by band's frontman Ray Cappo. The first song, "Message of the Bhagavad", is introduced by an excerpt of a Bhagavad Gita verses reading.

Mantra was distributed in Brazil featuring two bonus tracks, expanding the listing from 11 to 13. Howerever, the lyrics for tracks #12 and #13 were not included in the booklet. By the time of the release, the band hadn't played live in the country yet, which happened for the first time in 1996.

Critical reception
Trouser Press wrote that Cappo "is an articulate and principled spokesman for transcendental thought set to a tough 4/4 beat." In a retrospective review, Ox-Fanzine called Mantra "a tame rock album from another time."

Track listing

Credits

 Band
Ray Cappo – vocals, lyrics
Porcell – guitars, additional production, mixing
Adam Blake – bass
Dave Dicenso – drums

 Others
 Sri Kesava (Baby Gopal) – backing vocals
 Tom Soares – backing vocals
 Boston Bhakta Program – backing vocals
 Joe Tomlinson – backing vocals
 A. C. Bhaktivedanta Swami Prabhupada – spiritual representation

 Production
 Tom Soares – production
 Greg Calbi – mastering
 Tom Soares – mixing
 Tom Soares – sound engineer
 Fred Bortolotti – sound engineer (assistant)
 Howie Abrams – A&R
 Lego/Cut The Fat – art direction, design concept, photography
 Betty Swollocks – design
 Ken Salerno – photography (back cover)

References

1995 albums
Shelter (band) albums